François Pitot was a French naval officer.

He took part in the Battle of Groix commanding the frigate Républicaine française. In 1796, his ship, renamed Renommée, was captured by the 74-gun HMS Alfred. Pitot was acquitted by the court-martial for the loss of his ship.

In 1800, he captained Vengeance, fighting a battle against USS Constellation.

Sources and references 

 Fonds Marine. Campagnes (opérations ; divisions et stations navales ; missions diverses). Inventaire de la sous-série Marine BB4. Tome premier : BB4 1 à 482 (1790-1826) 
 2953 - NYMPHE, www.archeosousmarine.net

French military personnel of the French Revolutionary Wars
French naval commanders of the Napoleonic Wars